The 2004–05 season was Motherwell's 7th season in the Scottish Premier League, and their 20th consecutive season in the top division of Scottish football.

Squad
Updated 6 August 2011

Transfers

In

Out

Loans in

Loans out

Released

Competitions

Premier League

Table

Results summary

Results by round

Results

Scottish Cup

League Cup

Final

Squad statistics

Appearances

 

|-
|colspan="14"|Players who appeared for Motherwell but left during the season:
|}

Goal scorers

Clean sheets

Disciplinary record

Last updated 8 December 2010

See also
 List of Motherwell F.C. seasons

References

2004-05
Scottish football clubs 2004–05 season